Jennifer Levonian (born 1977) is a Philadelphia-based artist who creates cut-paper and watercolor animations.

In 2009, Levonian received a Pew Fellowship in the Arts award. She was the second prize winner of the third Outwin Boochever Portrait Competition in 2012.

Levonian's work has been screened and exhibited nationally. She has collaborated with organizations like WHYY and Library Company of Philadelphia.

Exhibitions
 Shake out your cloth, Fleisher-Ollman Gallery, 2016

Awards
 2012 Outwin Boochever Portrait Competition, 2nd prize
 2009 Pew Fellowship in the Arts Award

External links
 Official Website

References

American animators
American women animators
Living people
Pew Fellows in the Arts
21st-century American women artists
1977 births
21st-century American artists
Artists from West Virginia
College of William & Mary alumni
Rhode Island School of Design alumni